Wimbi Dira Airways was a scheduled and charter, passenger and cargo airline based in Kinshasa,  Democratic Republic of the Congo. It serves the country's main cities. As of May 2014 all of their planes were reported to be in storage.

History
The airline was established in 2003 and operations started on 13 August 2003. The company is managed by David Mavinga (General Manager) and employed 270 staff.

Banned Airline Status
This airline appears on the E.U. list of prohibited carriers. This means that it may not operate operations of any kind within the European Union community. This is due to the airline not meeting the safety standards set out by the European Union.

Services
Domestic scheduled destinations to (as of July 2010):

Democratic Republic of the Congo
Gbadolite - Gbadolite Airport
Gemena - Gemena Airport
Goma - Goma International Airport
Isiro - Matari Airport
Kalemie - Kalemie Airport
Kananga - Kananga Airport
Kindu - Kindu Airport
Kinshasa - N'djili Airport Hub
Kisangani - Bangoka International Airport
Lubumbashi - Lubumbashi International Airport
Mbandaka - Mbandaka Airport
Mbuji-Mayi - Mbuji Mayi Airport

Fleet
As of March 2012, Wimbi Dira Airways has no active aircraft in their fleet, all have either been leased out or withdrawn. Wimbi Dira Airways has been operating the following aircraft:

4 Boeing 707
1 Boeing 727
1 Douglas DC-3
4 Douglas DC-9
1 McDonnell Douglas MD-80
3 Antonov AN-12

Accidents and incidents
 On 4 October 2005 an Antonov 12V (9Q-CWC) departed Kisangani Airport with around 100 D. R. Congolese soldiers. The aircraft had a hard landing at Aru Airport, causing the landing gear to penetrate the cabin. During the evacuation two passengers ran into the still-operating propellers; both of the passengers died as a result.

References

External links
 List of Banned E.U. air carriers

Defunct airlines of the Democratic Republic of the Congo
Airlines established in 2003
Companies based in Kinshasa